is a Japanese photographer.

Publications
Hiroshima 1965. 1970.
Akio Nagasawa, 2018. Edition of 900 copies.

References

Japanese photographers
1935 births
Living people
Place of birth missing (living people)
20th-century photographers
20th-century Japanese artists
21st-century photographers
21st-century Japanese artists